Diane Kelly is an author of humorous, romantic mystery novels.

Her Tara Holloway series are humorous mysteries about an Internal Revenue Service, Criminal Investigation (IRS-CI) Special Agent. The first book in the series, Death, Taxes, and a French Manicure, won a Romance Writers of America Golden Heart Award.

Books

Tara Holloway series
Death, Taxes, and a French Manicure, 2011 
Death, Taxes, and a Skinny No-Whip Latte, 2012 
Death, Taxes, and Extra-Hold Hairspray, 2012 
Death, Taxes, and Peach Sangria, 2013 
Death, Taxes, and Hot-Pink Leg Warmers, 2013 
Death, Taxes, and Green Tea Ice Cream, 2013 
Death, Taxes, and Silver Spurs, 2014
Death, Taxes, and Cheap Sunglasses, 2015
Death, Taxes, and a Chocolate Cannoli, 2015
Death, Taxes, and a Satin Garter, 2016
Death, Taxes, and Sweet Potato Fries, 2017
Death, Taxes, and a Shotgun Wedding, 2017

Tara Holloway e-novellas
 Death, Taxes, and a Sequined Clutch, 2012 
 Death, Taxes, and Mistletoe Mayhem, 2013
 Death, Taxes, and Pecan Pie, 2017

Paw Enforcement
Paw Enforcement, 2014 
Paw and Order, 2014
Laying Down the Paw, 2015
Against the Paw, 2016
Above the Paw, 2016
Enforcing the Paw, 2017
The Long Paw of the Law, 2018
Paw of the Jungle, 2019
Bending the Paw, 2020

Paw Enforcement e-novellas
Upholding the Paw, 2015
Love Unleashed, 2017

House-Flipper Mysteries 

 Dead as a Door Knocker, 2019
Dead in the Doorway, 2020
Murder with a View, 2021
Batten Down the Belfry, 2022
Primer and Punishment, 2023

The Mountain Lodge Mysteries 

 Getaway With Murder, 2021
 A Trip with Trouble, 2022

Other works
Love, Luck, and Little Green Men, self-published, 2013 
"Five Gold Smuggling Rings", Amazon StoryFront, 2013

References

American women novelists
Living people
American mystery novelists
Women mystery writers
21st-century American novelists
21st-century American women writers
Year of birth missing (living people)